Waterloo is a Hanover Stadtbahn station served by lines 3, 7 and 9. South of here the lines branch off: lines 3 and 7 turn south in order to travel towards Wallensteinstraße and Wettbergen, while line 9 keeps west towards the centre of Hannover-Linden in order to reach Empelde. The station has four tracks to prevent simultaneously arriving trains from Empelde and Wettbergen from having to wait in the tunnel: see below for the layout. It was named for the Battle of Waterloo. The station was opened as the first underground Stadtbahn station in Hanover and renovated in 2014. The walls and columns now display images and information about the history of Hanover.

Station layout 
                                         Trains to Wettbergen
__

__ 
                                         Trains to Empelde
                                         Trains from Empelde
___

___
                                         Trains from Wettbergen

Next stations

References

Hanover Stadtbahn stations